The blue paradise flycatcher (Terpsiphone cyanescens) is a species of bird in the family Monarchidae.
It is endemic to Palawan.

It is mainly found in the understory of lowland primary and secondary forests, however populations are likely to be declining owing to habitat loss.

References

blue paradise flycatcher
Birds of Palawan
Endemic birds of the Philippines
blue paradise flycatcher
Taxonomy articles created by Polbot